Teghra is an assembly constituency in Begusarai district in the Indian state of Bihar. It was earlier called Barauni Assembly constituency.

Overview
As per Delimitation of Parliamentary and Assembly constituencies Order, 2008, No. 143 Teghra Assembly constituency is composed of the following: 
 Teghra community development block; 
 Bihat I to IV, Malhipur (North), Malhipur (South), Papraur, Garahara I & II, 
 Simaria I & II, Rajwara, Amarpur, Peepra Dewas and Hajipur gram panchayats of Barauni CD Block.

Teghra Assembly constituency is part of No. 24 Begusarai (Lok Sabha constituency).

Members of Legislative Assembly

Election results

2020 

In 1962, Chandra Shekhar Singh won from Barauni seat as the first Left party member to the state legislative assembly. Since then Teghra has been bastion of CPI till 2010 when it was defeated.

2015

2010
In the 2010 state assembly elections,  Lalan Kunwar of Bharatiya Janata Party won the newly constituted Teghra seat defeating his nearest rival Ram Ratan Singh of CPI.

References

External links
 

Assembly constituencies of Bihar
Politics of Begusarai district